The International Exhibition of Industry, Science and Art was a World's fair held in Edinburgh, Scotland in 1886.

Summary
The exhibition was held in The Meadows. It was opened on 6 May by Prince Albert Victor and ran to 30 October, occupied 30 acres, had 2,770,000 visits and made £5,555 profit.

Exhibits
Exhibits included an Old Edinburgh Street exhibit which included reconstructions of, by then, demolished buildings of the Royal Mile including the Netherbow Port; Czech violins; Turkish embroidery; and Scotch whisky. Neilson and Company of Glasgow exhibited the Caledonian Railway Single steam locomotive.

Perth's Magnus Jackson was awarded the bronze medal and diploma of merit for his photographs of ferns and foxgloves.

Legacy
The Zetland and Fair Isle exhibit gave Edinburgh city whale jawbones which formed an arch on Jawbone Walk. The jawbones were removed for restoration in 2014 due to deterioration and lack of maintenance. The Brass Founders' Pillar from the Exhibition was moved from the Meadows to Nicolson Square.

See also
Edinburgh Exhibition Cup#1886, football matches played during the exhibition
International Exhibition of Science, Art & Industry, similar event in 1890

References

External links
 http://www.scotlandsplaces.gov.uk/record/rcahms/125733/edinburgh-meadows-edinburgh-international-exhibition-1886/rcahms?item=756208#carousel aerial view of the exhibition
http://www.scotsman.com/lifestyle/heritage/lost-edinburgh-edinburgh-international-exhibition-1886-1-2895307
Edinburgh International Exhibition Tournament (series held in conjunction with the event) at Scottish Football Historical Archive

1886 in Scotland
Economic history of Scotland
Festivals in Edinburgh
History of Edinburgh
World's fairs in Edinburgh
1880s in Edinburgh